Hugo Alberto Morales (born 30 July 1974 in Buenos Aires) is an Argentine retired footballer who played as a midfielder.

External links
 Argentine League statistics  
 
 
 

1974 births
Living people
Footballers from Buenos Aires
Argentine footballers
Association football midfielders
Argentine Primera División players
Club Atlético Huracán footballers
Club Atlético Independiente footballers
Club Atlético Lanús footballers
Talleres de Córdoba footballers
La Liga players
Segunda División players
CD Tenerife players
Categoría Primera A players
Atlético Nacional footballers
Millonarios F.C. players
Club Deportivo Universidad Católica footballers
Argentina youth international footballers
Argentina under-20 international footballers
Argentina international footballers
Footballers at the 1996 Summer Olympics
Olympic footballers of Argentina
Olympic silver medalists for Argentina
Olympic medalists in football
Argentine expatriate footballers
Argentine expatriate sportspeople in Spain
Expatriate footballers in Spain
Expatriate footballers in Colombia
Expatriate footballers in Chile
Medalists at the 1996 Summer Olympics